Mikko Sumusalo (born 12 March 1990), is a Finnish professional football defender who plays for IFK Mariehamn and the Finnish national team. Sumusalo was born in Porvoo, Finland. Sumusalo began his senior club career playing for Klubi-04, before making his league debut for HJK at age 19 in 2009. He can play either leftback or wingback.

Sumusalo made his international debut for Finland in January 2012, at the age of 21.

Club career

HJK Helsinki
After starting his footballing career at his local FC Futura, the nine-year-old defender moved to HJK in 1999. After coming through the junior levels and the reserves, Sumusalo made his first division debut on 25 May 2009 against FC Lahti. Since then he made a total of 25 league appearances and some appearances in both Champions League qualifiers and Europa League qualifiers for HJK.

RB Leipzig
In January 2014, after the expiration of his contract with HJK, Sumusalo moved to Germany and joined 3. Liga side RB Leipzig signing until 2016. However, also due injuries, Sumusalo wasn't able to establish himself, earning only two caps until the end of the 2013−14 season. This situation lasted also for the first leg of the following campaign, especially since Leipzig had been promoted to the 2. Bundesliga and signed several high acclaimed players. To gain match practice, he was therefore loaned to 3. Liga club Hansa Rostock until the end of the 2014−15 season.

Rot-Weiß Erfurt and Chemnitzer FC
In June 2016 Sumusalo transferred from RB Leipzig to Rot-Weiß Erfurt. After only one year with 21 deployments in the league, the contract was dissolved. After a longer-term of Unemployment, the Chemnitzer FC took hin on January 17, 2018 until June 30 with an option to renewal under contract. However, he was discharged at the end of the season.

Back to Helsinki
For the season 2018/2019 Mikko Sumusalo returned to back to HJK Helsinki to play in the highest Finnish football league.

FC Honka
On 15 January 2019, Sumusalo signed for FC Honka.

International career
Sumusalo made his debut for Finland U21 in 2009 and was a regular member ever since. He made his senior debut on 22 January 2012 in a friendly against Trinidad and Tobago. In January 2013 he scored his first goal for the national team on the 5th minute in a match against Thailand.

Career statistics

International

Statistics accurate as of matches played on 13 January 2017

International goals

Honours and achievements

Klubi-04
 Finnish League Division 2 Group A: 2008

HJK Helsinki
 Finnish championship:  2009, 2010, 2011, 2012, 2013, 2018
 Finnish Cup: 2011

References

External links

 
 
 
 
 

1990 births
Living people
People from Porvoo
Finnish footballers
Finland international footballers
Association football forwards
Klubi 04 players
Helsingin Jalkapalloklubi players
RB Leipzig players
FC Hansa Rostock players
FC Rot-Weiß Erfurt players
FC Honka players
IFK Mariehamn players
Veikkausliiga players
3. Liga players
Finland youth international footballers
Finland under-21 international footballers
Finnish expatriate footballers
Expatriate footballers in Germany
Finnish expatriate sportspeople in Germany
Sportspeople from Uusimaa